Eva Margot born Johansen (1944 – 2019) was a Norwegian painter, active from the 1970s until her death in 2019. Her work is largely inspired by Norwegian nature and legends. She covers a diverse spectrum of styles: figurative, realism, symbolism, abstract.

Biography 
Eva Margot Roux (born Johansen) was born on January 10, 1944, and grew up in a working family in Mosby, a small town ten kilometers north of Kristiansand in Norway. Very early on she revealed the gifts of designer and storyteller. A few years later, she followed a course in drawing by correspondence (NKS, Norwegian course in correspondence), and followed courses in painting with the painter Arne Solheim in Kristiansand. She left for Paris in January 1966 until 1970. Works like "Le Grand Fossard" or "Une église" testify to her stay in France. She returned to settle in Mosby in 1971 where she devoted herself exclusively to her painting, and inaugurated her active career from 1977 by exhibiting regularly at Kristiansand. Eva joined the world of young "non-established" artists with whom she set up a group called "Cinq" and held several exhibitions from 1982 to 1985. Eva Margot multiplied individual or group exhibitions and produced hundreds of works up to on its last day, September 7, 2019. Eva Margot attended and collaborated with several Norwegian artists such as Wigo Aadnevik who supported her in her artistic project. He made a portrait of her in 19673. Between 1982 and 1985 she notably collaborated with the artists Sissel Stangenes and Alf Solbakken. She had friendly relations with artists like Ingrid Lønnou and Else Marie Jakobsen.

Work 
Her style ranges  from a delicate, sometimes childish lyricism to a brutal tragic, passing from an expressive symbolism to unusual or abstract perspectives. Her painting, of traditional invoice, contains strong colors and a rich light. Thus, sensitive and attentive to those around her from childhood and later to the events of her time, if Eva Margot often staged men and women, their reciprocal relationships and the relationship with nature, she always took great care, down to the smallest details, the aesthetic side of each painting.

Exhibitions and events 
The press has followed with interest the painter's career, throughout her career. The articles can be found at the artist's website; (each of them is written in Norwegian).

1979 - March: Torheim, Mosby. Separate exhibition. Individual exhibition, March 1979 in Torheim, Mosby. Article by Gunvald Opstad in the newspaper "Fedrelandsvennen" of March 22, 1979. Article title: "The blue flower of romanticism blooms in Mosby".
1982 - November Exhibition, Free Education Room, Kristiansand. Group.
1983 - March. Gallery Skansen, Risør. Separate exhibition. An unsigned article in the newspaper “Aust Agder Blad” titled “Exposition colorée” (“Fargesprakende utstilling”, another by Lodin Aasbo in the newspaper “Agderposten” titled “Exposition fascinating and rich in colors” (“Spennende og fargerik utstilling”) ) and a third signed NB in nr.4 by Rampelys titled "Passionate exhibition at the Skansen gallery"
1983 - November. Voie Grendehus with the group "Fem", Kristiansand. Exposition collective « Fem », novembre 1983 à Voie Grendehus. Article not signed in the newspaper "Sorlandet" of November 7, 1983. Title of the article: "non-amateurs exhibit at Voie grendehus".
1984 - February. Kristiansand Library with the group "Five", Kristiansand. Exposition collective « Fem », février-mars 1984 à la Bibliothèque de Kristiansand. Article de Knut Holt dans « Fedrelandsvennen » du 27 février.
1984 - February. Kristiansand Library with the group "Five", Kristiansan - see the article by Knut Holt in "Fedrelandsvennen" of March 27, 1984. Title of the article: "Fem" at the Library.
1984 -  Interview in TM - nytt (Norwegian bulletin of Transcendental Meditation) nr.2 from 1984, by Rolf Pihlstrom11. Title of the article: "Transcendental Meditation enriches art!" "(" TM beriker kunsten! ").
1985 - April. Kristiansand Library with the group "Five", Kristiansand.
1986 - November. Southern Exhibition, Kristiansand.
1987 - Individual exhibition, February 1987 in Perrongen (Le perron). An unsigned article in "Fedrelandsvennen" on February 3, 87, and another article in "Sorlandet" signed Trygve Diesen. Title of the article: "The Man in the Center of the Perron" ("Mennesket i Perrongens sentrum").
1987 - Individual exhibition, August 1987, Sting gallery in Stavanger. An article in "Stavanger Aftenblad" on August 15, 1987, signed Trond Borgen. Title of the article: "Strong faces and painful languor" ("Sterke ansikter og sår lengsel").
1989 - Individual exhibition, April–May 1989, Sting gallery in Stavanger. An article in "Stavanger Aftenblad" April 89, signed Oyvind Thuestad. Title of the article: "Eva Margot at Sting" ("Eva Margot på Sting").
1992 - October. Gallery Sting, Stavanger. Separate exhibition.
1993 - course with Curt Källman, "Vedic Art".
1997 - April. Garlic cloves, Gallery Sting, Stavanger. Group exhibition.
1998 - Gallery Sting, Stavanger. Separate exhibition.
2008 - Individual exhibition, August–September 2008 at Art Café, Marnardal. An article in "Lindesnes Avis" of August 1, 2008, by Dag Lauvland. Title of the article: "The Force of Color" ("Fargekraft på utstilling").
2009 - September. Backyard Bar, Kristiansand. Separate exhibition.
2014 - April. Nabostua, Øvrebø (near Kristiansand). Separate exhibition.
2015 - May. Present Food and More, Kristiansand. Separate exhibition.
2016 - June. The portal, Kristiansand. Separate exhibition.
2017 - March. Songtun, Nodeland (Kristiansand). Separate exhibition.
2017 - July / August. Lundkråga Pub Gallery, Kristiansand. Separate exhibition.

Notes and references

External links
The Work of Eva Margot, Philippe Roux's website on Eva Margot

Norwegian women painters
1944 births
2019 deaths
People from Kristiansand